Air Supply is the debut album by British/Australian soft rock band Air Supply released on CBS Records in December 1976. The lead single "Love and Other Bruises" was released in October, reaching No. 6 on the Kent Music Report Singles Chart, followed by the album peak at No. 17 on the Kent Albums Chart. While the album reached gold status in Australia, the second single "Empty Pages" did not reach the Top 40 in February 1977. The album was issued as Strangers in Love in Japan.

The album preceded the band's international recognition, which followed Lost in Love in 1980; the band would later release another self-titled album in 1985.

Background
Chrissie Hammond, Russell Hitchcock and Graham Russell met in May 1975 while performing in the Australian production of the Andrew Lloyd Webber and Tim Rice musical, Jesus Christ Superstar. With Hammond and Hitchcock on vocals and Russell on guitar, they formed Air Supply as a harmony vocal group in Melbourne. Hammond left to form Cheetah and was replaced by Jeremy Paul (ex-Soffrok) on bass guitar and vocals in 1976. The group's first single, "Love and Other Bruises", peaked at No. 6 on the Australian Kent Music Report Singles Chart in October. It was followed by Air Supply, their debut album, in December, which reached No. 17 on the Kent Music Report Albums Chart and achieved gold in Australia. The album was produced by Peter Dawkins (Spectrum, Ross Ryan) with Air Supply line-up as Hitchcock, Paul, Russell and drummer Jeff Browne, guitarist Mark McEntee and keyboardist/arranger Adrian Scott. The second single was "Empty Pages" peaked at No. 43. A national tour followed with Hitchcock, Paul, Russell and Scott joined by Nigel Macara (ex-Tamam Shud, Ariel) on drums and Brenton White (Skintight) on guitar. Brenton White rehearsed but did not perform with Air Supply.

Reception
Cash Box magazine said "Their music is polished, poised and mainstream without being predictable."

Track listing

Personnel
Air Supply members
 Russell Hitchcock – lead (1-3, 7, 8, 10, 11) and backing vocals, congas
 Mark McEntee – electric lead and rhythm guitars
 Graham Russell – electric and acoustic guitars, lead (2, 4, 5, 6, 8, 9, 11) and backing vocals
 Adrian Scott – keyboards, backing vocals
 Jeremy Paul – bass guitars, lead (2, 4) and backing vocals
 Jeff Browne – drums (all but 7)

Additional musicians
 Ian Bloxsom – extra percussion 
 Peter Deacon – piano (7)
 William Motzing – string arrangements and conductor
 Graeme Pearce – drums (7)

Recording details
 Producer – Peter Dawkins
 Engineer – Richard Lush at EMI Studios, Sydney.
 Except "Love and Other Bruises" engineer – Bruce Brown at Albert Studios
 Additional engineer – Martin Benge
 Mastered – CBS Records, Artarmon.

Artwork
 Art direction and design – J. Peter Thoeming
 Photography – Carroll Holloway

Charts

Certifications and sales

Release history

See also
 Air Supply (1985 album)

References

1976 debut albums
Air Supply albums
CBS Records albums
Albums produced by Peter Dawkins (musician)